The 2012–13 Liga MX season was the 66th professional top-flight football league season in Mexico, and the first under the league's current identity as "Liga MX". The season was split into two competitions: the Torneo Apertura and the Torneo Clausura—each of identical format and contested by the same eighteen teams.

Clubs
Eighteen teams participated in the season. Estudiantes Tecos was relegated to the Liga de Ascenso after accumulating the lowest coefficient over the past three consecutive seasons, ending its 36-year stay in the league. León was promoted, and as the winner of the 2011–12 Liga de Ascenso season, León returned to the top flight after being relegated 10 years earlier.

Managerial changes

Torneo Apertura
The 2012 Apertura was the opening competition of the season. The regular season began on July 20, 2012 and ended on November 11, 2012. The Liguilla tournament began on November 14, 2012 and ended on December 2, 2012. Santos Laguna had been successful in defending their title since 2009.

Regular season

Standings

Results

Liguilla – Apertura

 If the two teams are tied after both legs, the higher seeded team advances.
 Both finalists qualify to the 2013–14 CONCACAF Champions League (champion in Pot A, runner-up in Pot B).

Top goalscorers
Players ranked by goals scored, then alphabetically by last name.

Hat-tricks

Torneo Clausura
The 2013 Clausura is the second and final competition of the season. The regular season began on January 4, 2013. Tijuana were defending their inaugural champion title.

Regular season

Standings

Results

Liguilla – Clausura

 If the two teams are tied after both legs, the higher seeded team advances.
 "Away goals" rule is applied in the play-off round.
 Both finalists qualify to the 2013–14 CONCACAF Champions League (champion in Pot A, runner-up in Pot B).

Top goalscorers
As of May 5, 2013.  Source LigaMX.net – Estadística – Tabla de Goleo IndividualPlayers ranked by goals scored, then alphabetically by last name.

Hat-tricks

Relegation

Updated to games played on May 5, 2013Source: LigaMX.net – Estadística – Tabla General de Cociente

References

External links
 Official website of Liga MX
 Mediotiempo.com

 
Mx

1
2012-13